The Screen Award for Best Director is chosen by a distinguished panel of judges from the Indian "Bollywood" film industry and the winners are announced in January. Frequent winners include Sanjay Leela Bhansali (3), Rakesh Roshan and Ashutosh Gowariker (2)

Winners

See also
 Bollywood
 Screen Awards
 Cinema of India

References

Screen Awards